The women's 1500 metres event  at the 1978 European Athletics Indoor Championships was held on 12 March in Milan.

Results

References

1500 metres at the European Athletics Indoor Championships
1500
Euro